Jiří Kurka (born March 31, 1994) is a Czech professional ice hockey player. He is currently playing for BK Mladá Boleslav of the Czech Extraliga.

Kurka made his Czech Extraliga debut playing with BK Mladá Boleslav during the 2014-15 Czech Extraliga season.

References

External links

1994 births
Living people
BK Mladá Boleslav players
Czech ice hockey defencemen
Sportspeople from Mladá Boleslav
HC Benátky nad Jizerou players
BK Havlíčkův Brod players